Lithuanian Girl with Palm Sunday Fronds is an 1844 oil on canvas painting by the Polish-Lithuanian artist Kanuty Rusiecki in the Lithuanian Art Museum.

This painting shows a girl holding grasses and willow fronds (known as Easter palm) on Palm Sunday. She is standing in front of a Baroque church and wearing a traditional dress. Rusiecki was at the peak of his fame in Vilnius when he painted this picture. He specialized in portraits but is also known for genre works that placed the local heritage in a majestic setting. This painting became so popular that it is considered today a symbol of the Lithuanian 19th-century Romantic movement. 

The painting is similar to Rusiecki's earlier work, but less obviously symbolic:

References

artwork record on Europeana website

1844 paintings
Paintings in Lithuania
Polish paintings
Lithuanian paintings
Paintings of people